Salzbach is a small river of Hesse, Germany. It is a left tributary of the Seemenbach in Büdingen.

See also
List of rivers of Hesse

Rivers of Hesse
Rivers of the Vogelsberg
Rivers of Germany